The 2020 Japanese Super Cup (known as Fuji Xerox Super Cup 2020 for sponsorship reasons) was the 27th Japanese Super Cup since its reestablishment, and the 35th overall. It was held on 8 February 2020 between the 2019 J1 League champions Yokohama F. Marinos and the 2019 Emperor's Cup winners Vissel Kobe. It took place at the Saitama Stadium 2002, Saitama, Saitama.

This was Yokohama FM's first Super Cup appearance since 2014, and was looking to end its bad record of 5 defeats in all of its previous appearances, stretching back to 1984. At the other hand, this was Vissel's first ever Super Cup appearance.

Drawn 3–3 until the end of 90 minutes, Vissel Kobe won the match on penalties, which saw 9 consecutive penalties missed before Hotaru Yamaguchi ended the run and won Vissel its only second national trophy ever. The penalty also condemned Yokohama FM to its sixth Super Cup defeat.

Match details

References

Japanese Super Cup
Super
Yokohama F. Marinos matches
Vissel Kobe matches
Japanese Super Cup, 2020